Rob Edwards (born 24 May 1949 in Worcester, Worcestershire) is an English actor.

His television credits include: Doctor Who (the serials The Face of Evil and The Robots of Death), An Englishman's Castle, Secret Army, The Fourth Arm, By the Sword Divided, The Practice, Casualty, A Touch of Frost, Dangerfield, Midsomer Murders and Dalziel and Pascoe.

He attended RGS Worcester and Pembroke College, Oxford before training at the Bristol Old Vic Theatre School. He then joined the Royal Shakespeare Company in Stratford. He has performed in many productions including the BBC Shakespeare films of Henry V and  Henry IV, Part 1 and Henry IV, Part 2 as Prince John. Recent stage appearances include Hippolito in Women Beware Women by Thomas Middleton with the RSC in 2006, before which he played the role of Scar in Disney's The Lion King at the Lyceum Theatre in London for several years. His performance was nominated Best Actor in a Musical at the Olivier Awards in 2000.

References

External links
 

English male stage actors
English male television actors
Living people
1949 births
Male actors from Worcestershire
Alumni of Pembroke College, Oxford
Alumni of Bristol Old Vic Theatre School
People educated at the Royal Grammar School Worcester
Actors from Worcester, England